is a Japanese manga series written by Tatsukazu Konda and illustrated by Shimeji Yukiyama. It was serialized in Shogakukan's online platform Ura Sunday from April 2015 to November 2021.

Publication
Ginrō Blood Bone, written by Tatsukazu Konda and illustrated by Shimeji Yukiyama, was serialized on Shogakukan's online platform Ura Sunday from April 29, 2015, to November 6, 2021. Shogakukan collected its chapters in sixteen tankōbon volumes, released from August 12, 2015, to December 17, 2021.

The manga is licensed in France by Kurokawa.

Volume list

Notes

References

External links
 

Dark fantasy anime and manga
Shogakukan manga
Shōnen manga